Casper Davis (born 14 March 1966) is a Vincentian cricketer who featured as a right arm fast bowler. He played in 40 first-class and 23 List A matches for the Windward Islands from 1991 to 1999. Davis picked up exactly 100 wickets at an average of 27.44 in his first class career.

See also
 List of Windward Islands first-class cricketers

References

External links
 

1966 births
Living people
Saint Vincent and the Grenadines cricketers
Windward Islands cricketers